Ijakumo (The Born Again Stripper) is a 2022 suspense thriller produced by Toyin Abraham and had its theatrical release on 23 December 2022. The film stars an ensemble cast including Toyin Abraham, Kunle Remi, Lolade Okusanya, Bimbo Akintola, Olumide Oworu, Lillian Afegbai among others. The film was scripted by Kehinde Joseph and directed by Adebayo Tijani.

Synopsis 
Ijakumo (The Born Again Stripper) tells the story of Asabi (Toyin Abraham), the daughter of a powerful spiritualist who is hell-bent on destroying the life of her ex-lover, a now renowned Lagos big pastor, Jide(Kunle Remi) who cheated her and left her to die. Pastor Jide who also is not a true man of God, but belongs to some sort of cabal that commits all sorts of atrocity. In her quest to destroy Pastor Jide, she sought for the help of Sharon(Lolade Okusanya), a stripper and a church choir who Jide now begins to lust after to destroy him.

Selected Cast 

 Toyin Abraham as Asabi
 Kunle Remi as Pastor Jide
 Lolade Okusanya as Sharon and Mary
 Olumide Oworu as Young Jide
 Debbie Shokoya as Young Asabi
 Bimbo Akintola
 Kolawole Ajeyemi
 Lilian Afegbai
 Antar Laniyan
 Eso Dike
 Tomiwa Tegbe
 Deborah Ajijolajesu Shokoya

Production and release 
The premiere of the film saw a lot of important personalities in attendance including the Executive Governor of Lagos state, Governor Babajide Sanwo Olu, and a host of other celebrities who graced the occasion that was themed 'Sundays best', others present for the premiere were Odunlade Adekola, Iyabo Ojo, Lateef Adedimeji and others.

References 

2022 films